Paracantha ruficallosa is a species of tephritid or fruit flies in the genus Paracantha of the family Tephritidae.

Distribution
Costa Rica, Panama, Venezuela.

References

Tephritinae
Insects described in 1937
Diptera of North America
Diptera of South America